Eustathius of Antioch, sometimes surnamed the Great, was a Christian bishop and archbishop of Antioch in the 4th century. His feast day in the Eastern Orthodox Church is February 21.

Life
He was a native of Side in Pamphylia. About 320 he was bishop of Beroea, and he became patriarch of Antioch shortly before the Council of Nicaea in 325. In that assembly he distinguished himself zealously against the Arians, though the Allocutio ad Imperatorem with which he has been credited is probably not by him.

His anti-Arian polemic against Eusebius of Nicomedia made him unpopular among his fellow bishops in the East, and a synod convened at Antioch in 330 deposed him for adultery, which was confirmed by the emperor.

In the dispute with Eustathius of Antioch, who opposed the growing influence of Origen and his practice of an allegorical exegesis of scripture, seeing in his theology the roots of Arianism, Eusebius, an admirer of Origen, was reproached by Eustathius for deviating from the Nicene faith, who was charged in turn with Sabellianism. Eustathius was accused, condemned, and deposed at a synod in Antioch. The people of Antioch rebelled against this action, while the anti-Eustathians proposed Eusebius as the new bishop, but he declined. He was banished to Trajanopolis in Thrace, where he died, probably about 337, though possibly not until 370.

The people of Antioch, who loved and revered their patriarch, became indignant at the injustice done to him and were ready to take up arms in his defence. But Eustathius kept them in check, exhorted them to remain true to the orthodox faith and humbly left for his place of exile, accompanied by a large body of his clergy. His adherents in Antioch formed a separate community by the name of "Eustathians" and refused to acknowledge the bishops set over them by the Arians. When, after the death of Eustathius, St. Meletius became Bishop of Antioch in 360 by the united vote of the Arians and the orthodox, the Eustathians would not recognize him, even after his election was approved by the Synod of Alexandria in 362. Their intransigent attitude gave rise to two factions among the orthodox, the so-called Meletian Schism, which lasted till the second decade of the fifth century.

The only complete work by Eustathius is the De Engastrimytho contra Origenem.

The Commentary on the Hexameron attributed to him in the manuscripts is too late to be authentic.

References

External links

 "St. Eustathius, Patriarch of Antioch, Confessor", Butler's Lives of the Saints

3rd-century births
4th-century deaths
Doctors of the Church
Patriarchs of Antioch
Syrian Christian saints
4th-century Romans
4th-century archbishops
4th-century Christian saints